Zeta Herculis Moving Group is a set of stars that share a common motion through space.

The existence of this moving group was first published in 1958 by Olin J. Eggen. Based upon the high velocity motion of the star Zeta Herculis through space, he searched for stars that were following a similar velocity and direction. A total of 22 candidate members were identified. Among the group members he included β Hydri, ρ Persei, η Reticuli, φ1 Lupi, ζ Herculis and ε Octantis. He estimated the group velocity at 74.5 km/s. In 1970, Richard Woolley refined the list to ten stars, including φ2 Pavonis and ζ1/ζ2 Reticuli as members of this cluster.

The parallel motion of the stars in this group implies a common origin, and hence a similar age and composition. The membership of ζ Herculis and HD 158614 came into question because their composition appeared to show they were much younger than other members of the group. However, a statistical analysis of the metallicity for stars in this group showed no difference from a comparison sample, indicating that it may not be possible to determine more information about this group based on the composition of its members.

References

 
Moving groups